Camilla Broe is the first Danish citizen to be extradited to a country outside the European Union, when she was handed over to the American police after being indicted on 14 counts of drug trafficking.  She would have faced a sentence of up to 60 years in prison if she were convicted, but would have served only 6 months in the US before being deported to Denmark to serve another 2 to 8 years.

The alleged crime
Broe was indicted by a Florida grand jury on 14 counts of drug trafficking.  The Danish courts had not been presented with any evidence by the authorities in Florida.  Both courts are only ruling whether the United States application for her to be extradited fulfills the formal demands according to the extradition agreement between the two countries.

However, the media published stories from unknown officials claiming that Broe was alleged to have been one of the leaders of a drug smuggling operation which imported some 100,000 Ecstasy pills from the Netherlands to Florida towards the end of the 1990s. According to unnamed sources inside the Florida state attorney office, she was the partner of the head of the operation and not only helped to enlist smugglers, but also laundering the proceeds from the sale of the drugs.

Broe arrived at the United States in 1986 in order to study and then started a relationship with a man whom she later had a daughter with. The boyfriend turned out to be violent and at some point he became involved with the drug market. Allegedly, without her social network and living in a foreign culture (albeit for 4 years) she was not able to end the relationship and, for this reason, her defense is based on the Battered woman syndrome. When the police arrested the boyfriend she fled back to Denmark. At the time of the arrest of her partner the police informed her of the possibility that they may wish to inquire further into her involvement with the drug operations but she was not arrested nor formally charged. Broe is not denying that her boyfriend was involved in the drug market. Additionally, Broe confessed to involvement with arranging the drug couriers' trips.

Her life in Denmark
Camilla Broe and her daughter, from Jacob Orgad aka "Koki" convicted Ecstasy Drug Kingpin , returned to Denmark without any wealth and with no income . Family and friends supported them until she found a job. She is not known to have been involved in any criminal activity while living in Denmark.

Timeline

On 7 August 2009, a board of Danish judges decided her case could be heard before the Danish Supreme Court.

She was placed on house arrest with work release until extradition could be processed. However, she was jailed when she appealed the ruling to European Court of Human Rights, the house arrest being changed to incarceration in jail. She was taken to Vestre Fængsel on 10 August 2009. This prison is regarded as very tough compared to the county jail in Elsinore, where she had been detained previously.

Her case has been accepted by the European Court of Human Rights, but it did not stop her from being extradited to Florida.

The family has now created a foundation in order to raise money for her defence because her economy cannot provide a legal defense.

She was detained at the Federal Detention Center in Miami. Her inmate number is #82672-004.

Expected trial date was March 2012, but political pressure forced the court to start the trial no later than 14 December 2009.

On 5 January 2010, the judge ruled that the charges were subject to statutes of limitations.

However, on 12 January 2010, the prosecution requested that the case be tried by a higher court authority, informing that a new trial date has been set to 1 March 2010. 

On 25 February 2010, the court set her free but - because she entered the US under police escort - she faced charges of immigration violation.

She returned to Copenhagen on 1 March 2010. She had to take a direct flight as international arrest orders had not yet been cancelled.

On 22 March 2010 the appeal court followed the previous rulings and the case against her was dropped.

On 8 February 2013 the court in Lyngby awarded her DKK 701,362.11 for her time spent in Danish jails while she was waiting for the extradition case to be done. If she wants to seek compensation for her time spent in the United States she has to make case in the United States.

On 26 August 2014 decided the Danish Supreme Court that Camilla Broe not be entitled to compensation from the Danish State as conditions for extradition were met. If she wants compensation for her time in prison she must seek it in the United States for the time she spent in prison in Denmark and the US. The decision means that the Danish government never has to pay compensation in extradition cases. The Danish citizen must always seek compensation in the country in where he or she is extradited to.

The extradition agreement
In December 2007 Denmark and the United States entered an agreement about the terms of extradition between Denmark and the United States. Some points of interest are:

No later than 6 months after the sentence is handed out, the Danes must return to Denmark to serve their sentences.
The length of the trial has no limits.
The Danes will be given a new sentence based on Danish sentence limit upon their return to Denmark

Critics of this agreement claim that it motivates the extradited Danes to plead No contest as they probably will be released when returning to Denmark because charges like conspiracy, obstruction of justice are not punishable by Danish law.  Second, the trial in Florida is estimated to last 5–7 years in Florida if she is trying to get acquitted, because the witnesses could be difficult to find because most of them have served out the sentence they got in return for testifying against her, and are now living in other countries.

Also, the length of the sentence is different. In Denmark "manddrab" (manslaughter) is the term used by the Danish penalty law to describe the act of intentionally killing another person. No distinction between manslaughter and murder exists. The penalty goes from a minimum of five years (six years in the case of regicide) to imprisonment for life (which in Denmark seldom results in more than 16 years' imprisonment).

Public reaction
Many citizens are concerned about the alleged political deal and regard the trial in Florida as a show trial, but some, like the former editor of Ekstrabladet and adviser for the Minister for Family and Consumer Affairs Lars Barfoed, Karen Thisted had made critical and political comments about her actions.

A book was scheduled to be published in 2010.  It remains unclear whether some of the profit will benefit the defence but Denmark has no Son of Sam law as it is considered fair in the Danish culture to get a balanced view of criminal cases.

Agencies providing counselling to possible future exchange students now use this case as example of the possible dangers student could risk facing unless they have an exit-plan ready so they can escape home fast if they learn or just witness criminal activity while living abroad. It is expected that the case will have a lasting effect of lowering the number of young Danes who choose to study or work abroad.

See also
Niels Holck - A Danish citizen wanted for his alleged role in the Purulia arms drop case in India.
Abu Salem - An Underworld don who was extradited to India from Portugal.

External links
Camilla Broe Foundation
Save the justice - say NO to the Danish terrorbills - Save Camilla Broe, Facebook group
The Indictment Felony indictment, Grand Jury, US District Court District of South Florida
 http://www.hoejesteret.dk/hoejesteret/nyheder/Afgorelser/Documents/308-13.pdf
 http://www.b.dk/nationalt/hoejesteret-camilla-broe-faar-ingen-erstatning-for-udlevering
 http://www.b.dk/nationalt/advokat-systemet-har-ikke-behandlet-camilla-broe-godt

References

Danish people imprisoned abroad
People extradited to the United States
Living people
Prisoners and detainees of the United States federal government
People extradited from Denmark
Year of birth missing (living people)
Place of birth missing (living people)